CH-17 was a  of the Imperial Japanese Navy during World War II.

History
CH-17 was laid down by Tokyo Ishikawajima Zosen at their Fukagawa shipyard in 1941 and launched on 3 May 1941. 
On 31 July 1941, she was completed, commissioned, and registered to the Sasebo Naval District. On 1 October 1941, she was assigned to the 21st Subchaser Division (along with CH-4, CH-5, CH-6, CH-16, CH-18) and designated its flagship on 24 October 1941. On 8 December 1941, the division was assigned to the Second Base Force, Third Fleet.

Battle of Midway

Reinforcement of Leyte
In January 1944, she was assigned to Operation TA No. 9 which was tasked with the reinforcement of Leyte Island. Submarine Chaser Division 21 (consisting of CH-17 with CH-37) and Destroyer Division 30 (Yuzuki, Uzuki, Kiri) were to serve as escorts for three transports (Mino Maru, Sorachi Maru, Tasmania Maru) carrying 4,000 troops of the 5th Infantry Regiment and two landing craft tank (T.140, T.159) carrying ten Type 2 Ke-To light tanks and 400 Special Naval Landing Force marines. On 9 December 1944, the task force left Manila for Ormoc Bay. On 11 December 1944, the convoy was attacked 30 miles off the coast of Leyte by 40 USMC F4U Corsair fighter-bombers of VMF-211, VMF-218, and VMF-313. The planes sink Tasmania Maru (1,192 dead) and Mino Maru (14 dead). Uzuki stayed behind to rescue survivors while Sorachi Maru, Ch-17, and Ch-37 were diverted to land at Palompon; and T.140 and T.159 escorted by Yuzuki and Kiri landed their troops and tanks at Ormoc Bay. 8 of 10 tanks reach the shore but were quickly destroyed or captured on the beach by U.S. ground forces and the destroyer USS Coghlan. In the ensuing Battle of Ormoc Bay, both T.159 and T.140 are heavily damaged. T.159 was deemed a total loss and abandoned while T.140 was able to limp to safety. Sorachi Maru is able to safely disembark its troops at Palompon and then with CH-17 and Ch-37 as escorts, made it back to Manila on 3 December 1944. Uzuki was dispatched to join Kiri and Yuzuki with the damaged T.140 but was quickly spotted and torpedoed by the PT boats PT-490 and PT-492. While en route to Manila, Yūzuki was attacked and sunk by American aircraft. Kiri and T.140 made it to Manila on 3 December 1944.

Demise
Springer spots the ships first but is unable to close. Trepang is able to fire six torpedoes and one scores a hit, sinking T.146. CH-17 counterattacks and drops 14 depth charges on Trepang who retreats to deeper water. Springer then fires three torpedoes and is able to cripple CH-17 before finishing her off with a final salvo. CH-17 was struck from the Navy List on 25 May 1945.

References

Additional references
 
 
 

1941 ships
No.13-class submarine chasers
Maritime incidents in April 1945
World War II shipwrecks in the Pacific Ocean